The Circle is the eleventh studio album by American rock band Bon Jovi. Released on November 10, 2009, the album was produced by John Shanks. The album debuted at number 1 in several countries, including the U.S., where it sold 163,000 copies in its first week.

The Circle marks the band's return to their hard rock sound after a brief venture into country music with their previous album Lost Highway.

Recording and production
In an interview given to Rolling Stone, former Bon Jovi guitarist Richie Sambora says the album is a return to "rock and roll" and said "There’s going to be some big choruses on there. It sounds like Bon Jovi, but it sounds fresh. We experimented with a lot of new sounds and had a really good time working with John Shanks, who is also a really good guitar player, so he and I did a lot of ‘weaseling’ with the guitar sounds. There are a lot of really good guitar sounds and new kind atmospheres on the new Bon Jovi record, that I think makes it really modern. I think people are going to dig it, man. And it rocks hard."

In an interview on UK radio station Absolute Radio, Jon Bon Jovi stated the album title has multiple meanings. It stands for the fact that a circle is never ending, and that it also refers to Bon Jovi's inner circle – stating that "in this organization, the circle is very difficult to get into, and even more difficult to get out of."

The lead single, "We Weren't Born to Follow" is about the tough times we are experiencing in this economic crisis. "Superman Tonight" was released as the second single followed by "When We Were Beautiful" as the third single, all of which featuring music videos.
Work For The Working Man which was released as a promo single was also written about the DHL plant that closed in Ohio. Before the official release of the album, U.S. President Barack Obama's chief adviser David Axelrod had the lyrics to "Work for the Working Man" framed and hung in his White House office.

The album is the first record since 1988's New Jersey not to feature bonus tracks (all the subsequent albums from 1992's Keep The Faith through to 2007's Lost Highway have included songs not available in the United States). Lead singer Jon Bon Jovi has stated that there were one or two songs that he left off the album that could have been bonus tracks which he wanted to keep for the Greatest Hits album.

Release and reception

The Circle received mixed reviews from critics. At Metacritic, which assigns a normalized rating out of 100 to reviews from mainstream critics, the album has an average score of 52 out of 100, which indicates "mixed or average reviews" based on 10 reviews. Stephen Thomas Erlewine from AllMusic gave the album 2 stars out of 5 stating that "A knack for oversized choruses remains hardwired in Bon Jovi, but in this gloomy context, they act as reminders that they once sounded like they were a working band for working men instead of rich men fretting about a world they've long left behind". Gary Graff from Billboard gave the album 4 out of 5 stars saying that "The New Jersey group gets back to the business of rocking on its 11th studio album, The Circle". Whitney Pastorek from Entertainment Weekly gave the album C grade by saying "Between cliches and Jon's strained voice, The Circle just feels tired". Mikael Wood from Los Angeles Times gave the album 1.5 stars out of 4 stating that "The Circle shows off Bon Jovi's still-sharp knack for wedding blandly optimistic sentiments to predictably soaring choruses. Unfortunately, it's getting pretty hard to tell one song from the next". Christian Hoard from Rolling Stone gave the album 3 stars out of 5 by saying "It does rock--if your idea of rock is Aerosmith doing Diane Warren songs". Scott McLennan from The Boston Globe made a mixed review about the album stating that "Slick production and beer-ad bombast grease these 12 tracks. Lead singer Jon Bon Jovi has yet to meet a cliche he can’t work into a song".

The album topped the Billboard 200 chart when it debuted, but by the next week, it suddenly dropped to number 19.

The Circle debuted at the number-one position with sales of around 67,000 copies on the Japanese Oricon weekly album charts, becoming their fifth number-one album on the Japanese chart. Because of the album's number-one debut, Bon Jovi tied the Oricon charts' record for having five number-one albums as a Western artist, which was held by Mariah Carey and Simon & Garfunkel.

Track listing

Personnel
Bon Jovi 
 Jon Bon Jovi – lead vocals
 Richie Sambora – guitars, backing vocals
 David Bryan – keyboards
 Tico Torres – drums, percussion

Additional musicians
 Charlie Judge – additional keyboards and strings
 Hugh McDonald – bass guitar

Technical personnel
 John Shanks – producer
 Jon Bon Jovi – co-producer
 Richie Sambora – co-producer
 Jeff Rothschild – engineer
 Mike Rew – additional engineer
 Obie O'Brien – additional engineer
 Alex Gibson – additional engineer
 Lars Fox – Pro Tools editing
 Bob Clearmountain – mixing
 Brandon Duncan – mixing assistant
 George Marino – mastering
 Kevin Westenberg – band photography
 Kirk Edwards Photography – additional photography
 Andy West Design – art direction and design
 Lynne Bugai – album title and design
 Carol Corless – package producer

Charts

Weekly charts

Year-end charts

Certifications

Release history

References

Bon Jovi albums
2009 albums
Albums produced by John Shanks
Island Records albums
Mercury Records albums
Albums produced by Richie Sambora